Frontier Pony Express  is a 1939 American Western film directed by Joseph Kane and starring Roy Rogers, Lynne Roberts (as Mary Hart) and Noble Johnson as the lead villain.

Plot
At the start of the American Civil War in 1861 the Pony Express is of vital importance to the United States.  A Confederate secret agent, Brett Langhorne, is working undercover by purchasing the newspaper in the town of St. Joe. Accompanied by his sister they meet Roy Rogers, a Pony Express rider, who rescues her from a runaway stagecoach.  Brett unsuccessfully tries to get Roy to work for money to help the Confederacy.

Brett's local contact is Senator Calhoun Lassiter who Brett and the Confederacy believe will assist in bringing California into the Confederacy. But Lassiter betrays both the United States of America and the Confederacy as he wants to make California an independent "Republic of the Pacific" that he will despotically rule. To this end, Lassiter commissions outlaw Luke Johnson and his gang to steal, by force, critical documents being transmitted through the town of St. Joe by Pony Express. Roy risks limb and life to protect the mission of the Pony Express against the vicious outlaws, unaware of the Confederate agents supporting them. He finally learns the full extent of the plot when Lassiter and Langhorne have a falling out, and Lassiter shoots the young man in the back; and Langhorne confesses the plot to Roy as he dies. Rogers, the Pony Express officials, and the cavalry then work out a plan which brings an end to the machinations of Lassiter and Johnson.

Principal Cast
Roy Rogers as Pony Express Rider Roy Rogers
Mary Hart as Ann Langhorne
Don Dillaway as Brett Langhorne
Noble Johnson as Luke Johnson
Edward Keane as Sen. Calhoun Lassiter
Raymond Hatton as Horseshoe the Trapper
William Royle as Dan Garrett
Ethel Wales as Mrs. Murphy (Langhorne's housekeeper)
Jack Kirk as Cavalry Captain
Monte Blue as "Cherokee", a rider

Soundtrack
Roy Rogers - "My Old Kentucky Home"
Roy Rogers - "Rusty Spurs"

External links

1939 films
1939 Western (genre) films
Republic Pictures films
American black-and-white films
Works about the Pony Express
American Western (genre) films
Films set in 1861
American Civil War films
Films directed by Joseph Kane
1930s English-language films
1930s American films